Priyanka Lalaji, better known as Priyaa Lal is a British actress who primarily appears in Malayalam films. She made her cinematic debut in the Malayalam film Janakan in 2010, directed by N. R. Sanjeev with Mohanlal and Suresh Gopi.

Early life 
Priyaa Lal was born in Ras al-Khaimah in the United Arab Emirates to a Christian family. Her parents Lalaji and Beena are from Kerala. She has an elder brother Deepak Lalaji. When Priyaa was a young child, her family migrated to the United Kingdom, to Liverpool, England.

Career 
Priyaa debuted with Janakan in 2011 which was a commercial success. She later did a couple of movies in Malayalam film industry  including Killadi Raman (2011) and Lord Livingstone 7000 Kandi (2015).

Filmography

Film

Television

References

External links
 

Year of birth missing (living people)
Living people
People from the Emirate of Ras Al Khaimah
Emigrants from the United Arab Emirates to the United Kingdom
British film actresses
British television actresses
British actresses of Indian descent
British Christians
Malayali people
Actresses from Liverpool
British expatriate actresses in India
European actresses in India
Actresses in Malayalam cinema
Actresses in Tamil cinema
Actresses in Telugu cinema
21st-century British actresses